Oak Hill is an historic home of the Marshall family in Delaplane, Virginia and a working farm with a view of the Blue Ridge Mountains.

It lies north of I-66, just east of the US-17/Delaplane exit from westbound I-66. It consists of two separate houses connected by a passageway. John Marshall lived in the Oak Hill house until his marriage in 1783.

In 1819, John Marshall built an attached  temple-form Classical Revival house for his firstborn son, lawyer and future delegate Thomas. Thomas died in 1835 and his son, CSA Lt.Col. Thomas Marshall in late 1864, so Oak Hill was sold out of the Marshall family.  The property is now a private residence. It was listed on the National Register of Historic Places in 1973.

Oak Hill is currently owned by Charles Chamberlain.  It is located directly to the North of Barrel Oak Winery, and has three acres of Norton grapes planted on the Westward-facing slope facing I-66.

References

External links
 John Marshall House, U.S. Route 17 vicinity, Marshall, Fauquier County, VA at the Historic American Buildings Survey (HABS)

Georgian architecture in Virginia
Federal architecture in Virginia
Houses completed in 1773
Houses completed in 1819
Houses on the National Register of Historic Places in Virginia
Houses in Fauquier County, Virginia
National Register of Historic Places in Fauquier County, Virginia
Historic American Buildings Survey in Virginia